The Belin (also: Билин Bilin) is a river in Tuva. It is a tributary of the Little Yenisey (Kızıl-Xem), running parallel to the Mongolian border.

References

Rivers of Tuva